The American Pain Society (APS) was a professional membership organization and a national chapter of the International Association for the Study of Pain (IASP).

History
Around the time of Purdue Pharma releasing OxyContin into the market in 1996, the society introduced "pain as 5th vital sign" campaign.
APS was reported to be one of several nonprofit groups that advocated use of opioid painkillers contributing to the Opioid epidemic in the United States.

In June 2019, the APS was forced to close amid allegations that it colluded with pharmaceutical companies producing opioids. The APS claimed that the reason for the bankruptcy was the numerous legal expenses which resulted from lawsuits claiming the organization was acting as a front group for opioid drugmakers. The Chronicle of Higher Education reported that several former APS members are organizing a new society called the U.S. Association for the Study of Pain.

Publications
The society's official journal was titled The Journal of Pain, and published by Elsevier. The society had issued a total of nine guidelines throughout its period of existence.

References

Medical associations based in the United States
Organizations established in 1977
Medical and health organizations based in Illinois
1977 establishments in the United States
2019 disestablishments in Illinois
Organizations disestablished in 2019
Organizations based in Chicago
Opioid epidemic
Opioids in the United States